Harry John Arndt (1879-1921) was a Major League Baseball (MLB) second baseman. He was born on February 12, 1879, in South Bend, Indiana. He played four seasons, with the Detroit Tigers, Baltimore Orioles, and St. Louis Cardinals. Arndt played in 271 games with 244 hits in 985 at bats. He had a .248 average with six home runs and 99 runs batted in. Arndt died on March 25, 1921, in his home town of South Bend.

References

External links

1879 births
1921 deaths
New York Yankees players
Detroit Tigers players
St. Louis Cardinals players
Baseball players from South Bend, Indiana
Minor league baseball managers
Battle Creek Cero Frutos players
Columbus Senators players
Louisville Colonels (minor league) players
Wilmington Peaches players
Providence Grays (minor league) players
Wilkes-Barre Barons (baseball) players
South Bend Benders players
Notre Dame Fighting Irish baseball coaches
Shamokin (minor league baseball) players